Mohiuddin Ahmed (15 January 1925 – 12 April 1997) was a Bangladesh Awami League politician. He was elected a member of parliament in 1973, 1979 and 1991.

Birth and early life 
Ahmed was born on 15 January 1925 in Pirojpur district.

Career 
Ahmed was elected a member of parliament in 1973 from Bakerganj-10 (Extinct), 1979 from Bakerganj-17 (Extinct) and 1991 from Pirojpur-3.

References 

1925 births
1997 deaths
People from Pirojpur District
Awami League politicians
1st Jatiya Sangsad members
2nd Jatiya Sangsad members
5th Jatiya Sangsad members
Bangladesh Krishak Sramik Awami League central committee members